Gordon Mackie may refer to:

 Gordon Mackie (politician) (1912–1990), Australian politician
 Gordon Mackie (footballer) (1909–1983), Australian rules footballer